Bematists or bematistae (Ancient Greek βηματισταί (bēmatistaí, 'step measurer'), from 
βῆμα (bema, 'pace')), were specialists in ancient Greece and ancient Egypt who measured distances by pacing.

Measurements of Alexander's bematists
Bematists accompanied Alexander the Great on his campaign in Asia. Their measurements of the distances traveled by Alexander's army show a high degree of accuracy to the point that it had been suggested that they must have used an odometer, although there is no direct mentioning of such a device:

The table below lists distances of the routes as measured by two of Alexander's bematists, Diognetus and Baeton. They were recorded in Pliny's Naturalis Historia  (NH 6.61–62). Another similar set of measurements is given by Strabo (11.8.9) following Eratosthenes. Eratosthenes calculated the circumference of the Earth based on work of Egyptian bematists.

Notes:
1) 1 mille passus = 
2) 1 Attic stadion =   
3) The route is not recorded to have been followed by Alexander himself.

List of bematists 
 Amyntas
 Baeton
 Diognetus
 Philonides of Chersonissos

See also 
 Ancient Greek units of measurement
 Gromatici
 Surveyor's wheel

References

Bibliography 
 Engels, Donald W. (1978). Alexander the Great and the Logistics of the Macedonian Army. University of California Press, Los Angeles, 1978, 

Military personnel of Alexander the Great
Ancient Greek technology
Obsolete occupations
Length, distance, or range measuring devices